Emily Hampshire (born 1979) is a Canadian actress. Her best known roles include Angelina in the 1998 romantic comedy Boy Meets Girl, Vivienne in the 2006 film Snow Cake, Jennifer Goines in the Syfy drama series 12 Monkeys (2015–2018), and Stevie Budd in the CBC comedy series Schitt's Creek (2015–2020), as well as the voice role of Misery in the YTV animated series Ruby Gloom (2006–2008). Hampshire has held leading roles in the series Chapelwaite (2021–present) and The Rig (2023–present).

Early life
Hampshire was born  in Montreal. She became interested in acting at age 11 after attending a performance of Les Miserables with her mother. Her interests were solidified by the vice principal of her all-girls Catholic school, who praised her performance during a school theatre production. At age 16, she moved to Toronto to pursue roles in TV and film. She was accepted into the American Academy of Dramatic Arts shortly after high school but never attended, as it conflicted with a film opportunity.

Career

Hampshire has been professionally active in the Canadian film and television industry since 1996. She has starred in the Canadian series This Space For Rent, Carl², and Northern Town. She played Margaret in The Life Before This, a feature film directed by Jerry Ciccoritti, which premiered at the Toronto International Film Festival in 1999.

In 2006, starred alongside Kevin Zegers and Samaire Armstrong in the 2006 romantic comedy It's a Boy/Girl Thing, in which she played the character Chanel. In 2009, she appeared in The Trotsky as Leon Trotsky's love interest Alexandra. In 2010, she starred in the Canadian indie film, Good Neighbours. Hampshire has also done voice-acting, voicing the character Misery on the animated series Ruby Gloom, Diana Barry in Anne of Green Gables: The Animated Series, Chloe Crashman in Carl Squared, Starr in 6Teen, and Alyson Malitski in Braceface.

On May 23, 2012, in Cannes, France, Hampshire and fellow actress Sarah Gadon were presented with the first Birks Canadian Diamond award during Telefilm Canada's inaugural Tribute To Canadian Talent press event and reception. Also in 2012, Hampshire starred in David Cronenberg's Cosmopolis as Jane Melman, and co-starred in Sean Garrity's comedy film My Awkward Sexual Adventure, for which she received positive critical notice. The same year she was cast in the futuristic-zombie film The Returned.

In 2014, Hampshire was cast in the Syfy series 12 Monkeys in the recurring role of Jennifer Goines, a reimagined version of Brad Pitt's character from the film on which the series is based; in 2015, she was upped to a series regular for the show's second season. From 2015 to 2020, she played Stevie Budd in the CBC television series Schitt's Creek.

In late 2015, Hampshire was cast in Xavier Dolan's independent film The Death and Life of John F. Donovan, which also stars Natalie Portman, Kathy Bates, and Susan Sarandon.

In 2021, she appeared in the music video for The Tragically Hip's single "Not Necessary", from their EP Saskadelphia.

Personal life
In 2006, Hampshire married Matthew Smith, a former soccer player turned agent-in-training at the William Morris talent agency. They divorced shortly before she was cast in Schitt's Creek in 2014. In September 2018, it was confirmed that Hampshire was in a relationship with singer-songwriter Teddy Geiger; they became engaged in November 2018. They ended their engagement on June 10, 2019.

Hampshire identifies as pansexual.

In 2007, Hampshire moved to Los Angeles. She became a naturalized U.S. citizen in September 2014 and currently divides her time between Los Angeles and Toronto.

Filmography

Film

Television

Video games
 Command & Conquer 4: Tiberian Twilight (2010), as Lillian Parker

Awards and nominations

References

External links
 

1980s births
Date of birth missing (living people)
20th-century Canadian actresses
21st-century Canadian actresses
Actresses from Montreal
Anglophone Quebec people
Canadian child actresses
Canadian film actresses
Best Supporting Actress in a Comedy Series Canadian Screen Award winners
Canadian television actresses
Canadian voice actresses
Canadian LGBT actors
Living people
Naturalized citizens of the United States
Pansexual actresses
Canadian Comedy Award winners
21st-century Canadian LGBT people
20th-century Canadian LGBT people